The 2003 O'Byrne Cup was a Gaelic football competition played by the teams of Leinster GAA.

O'Byrne Cup

References

External links
Leinster G.A.A. Results 2003

O'Byrne Cup
O'Byrne Cup